Audru Polder's Nature Reserve is a nature reserve which is located in Pärnu County, Estonia.

The protected area was founded in 2007 on the basis of Audru Polder's Protected Area and partly Pärnu Bay Protected Area.

References

Nature reserves in Estonia
Geography of Pärnu County